Forgive and Forget is a 2000 British made-for-television film in which a young latent gay man confronts his sexuality and increasing jealousy when his best friend moves in with his new girlfriend. The film was broadcast on ITV on 3 January 2000.

Plot
The close friendship between plasterer David (Steve John Shepherd) and mature-aged student Theo (John Simm) becomes threatened when Theo reveals that he intends to move in with Hannah (Laura Fraser), his photographer girlfriend of six months. The short-tempered David, intensely protective of his best friend, plots to break the pair up, using Hannah's insecurities against them. When they do separate, David reveals his sexual  orientation and true feelings for Theo on his favourite talk-show, Judith Adams' (Meera Syal) Forgive and Forget.

Cast

Reception
Writing for Variety, Dennis Harvey has mixed feeling about the script, praising Mark Burt's balance of "the primary character trio's unremarkable yet complex emotions, framing them in well-captured pub/construction site/family milieus." But felt that the "somewhat gratuitous running gag—glimpses of the titular, fictional chat show, a kinder-gentler Jerry Springer-type mix of real folks and hot-button topics—suddenly takes center stage." He added that this "good little movie abruptly grows loud, large and heavy-handed in the last reel." Harvey praised the acting saying that "there's much to enjoy here, particularly in the uniformly fine cast. … Shepherd … is a real find, convincingly rendering David as withdrawn, laddish and lovesick all at once. Apart from some killing-time interludes set to pop tunes, and the rather cheesy flash of horizontal-wipe scene transitions, helmer Aisling Walsh lends material both youthful breeziness and emotional weight."

Filmcritic.com'''s Christopher Null dismissed the film, declaring that if "you manage to stay interested, well, you're a stouter fellow than I."TV Guide'''s Troy Lambert wrote that despite "the reality-challenged script, director Aisling Walsh delivers decent performances from the cast, especially Shepherd, Simm and Fraser as the unlikely three-way."

References

External links 

2000 drama films
British LGBT-related films
Gay-related films
LGBT-related drama films
2000 LGBT-related films
2000 films
2000s English-language films
2000s British films
British drama television films